Eden, an electoral district of the Legislative Assembly in the Australian state of New South Wales was created in 1859 and abolished in 1894.


Election results

Elections in the 1890s

1891

Elections in the 1880s

1889

1887

1885

1882

1880

Elections in the 1870s

1877

1874-75

1872

Elections in the 1860s

1869-70

1864-65

1860

Elections in the 1850s

1859

References 

New South Wales state electoral results by district